David Albert McDaniel (January 8, 1876 – December 18, 1958) was an American football player and coach. He served as the head football coach at the University of Arkansas in 1903, compiling a record of 3–4.

Born in 1876 to Lewis Tillman and Cornelia (née Stuart) McDaniel, he was an alumnus of the University of Texas. He was later a lawyer and teacher, based in Waco. He died there in 1958.

Head coaching record

References

External links
 

1876 births
1958 deaths
Arkansas Razorbacks football coaches
Texas Longhorns football players
Texas lawyers